Sardeka (also Xardeka, Chardeka, Chardeca) is a Basque place name that points out mountain passes by analogy of form with a fork. This approach explains the pass name Hourquette in the Gascon Pyrenees.

The name sardeka is generally attributed to mounts (borrowed from a neighboring pass):
Sardeka: mounts (494 m) in Gotein-Libarrenx, (1 555 m) near Pellüsa gaina or (1 440  m) near Arthanolatze gaina,
Sardeka gaina: a mount (1 893 m) and a crest (1 437 m) near Eskantolha,
Hargaina Sardeka (852 m) in Aussurucq,

Notes 

Place name etymologies
Basque toponymy